Marc or MARC may refer to:

People
 Marc (given name), people with the first name
 Marc (surname), people with the family name

Acronyms
 MARC standards, a data format used for library cataloging,
 MARC Train, a regional commuter rail system of the State of Maryland, serving Maryland, Washington, D.C., and eastern West Virginia
 MARC (archive), a computer-related mailing list archive
 M/A/R/C Research, a marketing research and consulting firm
 Massachusetts Animal Rights Coalition, a non-profit, volunteer organization
 Matador Automatic Radar Control, a guidance system for the Martin MGM-1 Matador cruise missile
 Mid-America Regional Council, the Council of Governments and the Metropolitan Planning Organization for the bistate Kansas City region
 Midwest Association for Race Cars, a former American stock car racing organization 
 Revolutionary Agrarian Movement of the Bolivian Peasantry (Movimiento Agrario Revolucionario del Campesinado Boliviano), a defunct right-wing political movement
 Mid-Atlantic Rowing Conference, a college rowing conference.

Other uses
 Marc is the French word for pomace, fruit solids as used for making pomace brandy
 Marz, Austria, aka Márc, a town
 Marc (cycling team), a Belgian road-racing team 1978–1980
 Marc (TV series), a pop music television show presented by Marc Bolan
 MSC Marc, a finite element analysis software
 MARC Cars Australia, an Australian motor racing team and manufacturer
 Various related obsolete units of weight - see Apothecaries' system

See also
 Marc's, a drugstore chain in Ohio, United States
 Marc Marc, Saint Lucia, a city 
 Mark (disambiguation)
 Marcus (disambiguation)
 Month of March